A256 may refer to:

 A256 road, a road running through East Kent in England
 A256 motorway (Netherlands)